Girl 6 may refer to:
Girl 6, a 1996 film by Spike Lee
Girl 6 (album), the soundtrack for the film, composed by Prince
“Girl 6” (song), the title song for the soundtrack